That's What Friends Are For is a song by the British rock band Slade, released in 1987 as the second single from their fourteenth studio album You Boyz Make Big Noize. The song was written by lead vocalist Noddy Holder and bassist Jim Lea, and produced by Roy Thomas Baker. It reached No. 95 in the UK, remaining in the charts for the one week.

Background
Slade began writing and recording material for their You Boyz Make Big Noize album in 1986. Hoping to record a hit album that would put them back in the public eye, the lead single "Still the Same" was released in February 1987 but stalled just inside the UK Top 75. In choosing the next single, RCA selected "That's What Friends Are For",. which was released in April 1987, a week prior to the release of You Boyz Make Big Noize. It reached No. 95 in the UK, and would be the band's last UK release under RCA.

"That's What Friends Are For" was one of two tracks from the album to be produced by Roy Thomas Baker. Initially it was planned for Baker to produce the entire album, but Slade felt his working methods were too lengthy and expensive. Prior to the single's release, in a 1987 fan club interview, guitarist Dave Hill said: ""That's What Friends Are For" looks to be the next single, mainly because there's a certain person up at RCA who is going wally over it." Describing the song, Hill said: "This is a 'scarf waver' type of number".

Release
"That's What Friends Are For" was released on 7" and 12" vinyl by RCA Records in the UK only. In Europe, it was given a 12" vinyl release, and a 7" vinyl release in Australia and New Zealand. The B-side, "Wild Wild Party", had first appeared on the soundtrack of the 1986 British film Knights & Emeralds, along with "We Won't Give In". It would later appear on the band's 2007 compilation B-Sides.

On the 12" single, three B-sides were included: "Hi Ho Silver Lining," "Wild Wild Party" and "Lock Up Your Daughters (Live)". The band's cover of "Hi Ho Silver Lining" was taken from the band's 1985 album Crackers: The Christmas Party Album, while "Lock Up Your Daughters" was taken from the band's 1982 live album Slade on Stage.

Promotion
No music video was filmed to promote the single. In the UK, the band performed the song on the BBC children's show The Krankies Elektronik Komik.

Critical reception
Upon release, "That's What Friends Are For" was a single reviewed on BBC Radio One's Singles Out programme on 18 April. The single received a thumbs up by Welsh singer/presenter Aled Jones, Dominica calypso musician The Wizzard and English radio broadcaster Janice Long. In a review of You Boyz Make Big Noize, Kerrang! felt the song, as with the rest of the album, bore the "unmistakable Slade stamp" with "stomp-along, shout-it-out choruses", but also commented that it "leans heavily on the sentimental".

Formats
7" Single
"That's What Friends Are For" - 3:17
"Wild Wild Party" - 2:55

12" Single
"That's What Friends Are For" - 3:17
"Hi Ho Silver Lining" - 3:24
"Wild Wild Party" - 2:55
"Lock Up Your Daughters (Live)" - 4:03

Chart performance

Personnel
Slade
Noddy Holder - lead vocals
Jim Lea - synthesizer, bass, backing vocals, producer of all B-Sides
Dave Hill - lead guitar, backing vocals
Don Powell - drums

Additional personnel
Roy Thomas Baker - producer of "That's What Friends Are For"
Quick On The Draw Ltd. - design

References

1987 singles
1987 songs
Slade songs
RCA Records singles
Songs written by Noddy Holder
Songs written by Jim Lea
Song recordings produced by Roy Thomas Baker